Joseph or Joe Clark may refer to:

Arts
Joseph Clark (painter) (1834–1926), English painter in oils known for domestic scenes
Joseph Clayton Clark (1857–1937), English artist who worked as "Kyd", illustrator of the novels of Charles Dickens
Joseph Benwell Clark (1857–1938), English painter, engraver and book illustrator
Joseph Bernard Clark (1868–1940), British ornamental plasterer

Government and politics
Joseph Clark (New York politician) (1787–1873), New York politician
Joseph Clement Clark (1858–1929), American politician and physician
Joseph Alfred Clark (1872–1951), New South Wales politician
Joe Clark (Australian politician) (1897–1992)
Joseph S. Clark Jr. (1901–1990), United States Senator from Pennsylvania and mayor of Philadelphia
Joe Clark (born 1939), 16th Prime Minister of Canada

Sports
Joseph Sill Clark Sr. (1861–1956), American tennis player
Joe Clark (footballer, born 1874), Scottish footballer with Dundee, Brighton United, Newton Heath, Dunfermline Athletic and East Fife
Joe Clark, Canadian competitor in lacrosse at the 1904 Summer Olympics
Joe Clark (footballer, born 1890) (1890–1960), English footballer with Cardiff City, Southampton and Rochdale
Joe Clark (footballer, born 1920) (1920–2008), English footballer with Leyton Orient
Joe Ira Clark (born 1975), American basketball player

Other people
Joseph Samuel Clark (1871–1944), African-American academic administrator
Joseph J. Clark (1893–1971), admiral in the U.S. Navy during World War II
Joe Louis Clark (1938–2020), former New Jersey high school principal, portrayed in the 1989 film Lean on Me
Joe Clark (aeronautics) (1941–2020), American aerospace pioneer
Joseph Lewis Clark (1949–2006), American convicted murderer executed in Ohio in May 2006

Fictional characters
Joe Clark (character), a character on The Young and the Restless
Joe Clark, a The Shield character

See also
Joseph Clarke (disambiguation)
"Old Joe Clark", a folk song